Norway was represented by Grethe Kausland and Benny Borg, with the song "Småting", at the 1972 Eurovision Song Contest, which took place on 25 March in Edinburgh. "Småting" was chosen as the Norwegian entry at the Melodi Grand Prix on 19 February.

Before Eurovision

Melodi Grand Prix 1972
The Melodi Grand Prix 1972 was held at the studios of broadcaster NRK in Oslo, hosted by Vidar Lønn-Arnesen. Five songs were presented in the final with each song sung twice by different singers, once with a small combo and once with a full orchestra. The winning song was chosen by voting from a 14-member public jury who each awarded between 1 and 5 points per song.

At Eurovision 
On the night of the final Kausland and Borg performed 6th in the running order, following the United Kingdom and preceding Portugal. "Småting" was a rather old-fashioned song, lyrically very similar in theme to the previous year's "Lykken er", and at the close of voting had picked up 73 points, placing Norway 14th of the 18 entries.

Voting

References 

1972
Countries in the Eurovision Song Contest 1972
1972
Eurovision
Eurovision